Daniel Suluka-Fifita (born 19 August 1999) is a professional rugby league footballer who plays as a  for the South Sydney Rabbitohs  in the NRL.

Background
Suluka-Fifita played his junior rugby league for the Matraville Tigers. Suluka-Fifita is of Tongan descent

Career

2020
Suluka-Fifita made his debut in round 12 of the 2020 NRL season for the Sydney Roosters against the Gold Coast Titans.

2021
In round 3 of the 2021 NRL season, he was sent to the sin bin during the Sydney Roosters 26-16 loss against archrivals Souths after punching Jai Arrow in the back of the head after making a tackle.

2022
On 13 June, Suluka-Fifita signed a three-year deal to join arch-rivals South Sydney starting in the 2023 NRL season.  Suluka-Fifita was later released early from the Sydney Roosters and made his club debut for Souths in their round 17 match against Newcastle which South Sydney won 40-28.

References

External links
Sydney Roosters profile

1999 births
Living people
Australian sportspeople of Tongan descent
Rugby league players from Sydney
Rugby league props
South Sydney Rabbitohs players
Sydney Roosters players